Bitter ash is a common name for several plants and may refer to:

Euonymus atropurpureus, native to the eastern United States and Canada
Picrasma excelsa, native to the Caribbean
Quassia amara, native to Central and South America